In geometry, the hexaoctagonal tiling is a uniform tiling of the hyperbolic plane.

Constructions 
There are four uniform constructions of this tiling, three of them as constructed by mirror removal from the [8,6] kaleidoscope. Removing the mirror between the order 2 and 4 points, [8,6,1+], gives [(8,8,3)], (*883). Removing the mirror between the order 2 and 8 points, [1+,8,6], gives [(4,6,6)], (*664). Removing two mirrors as [8,1+,6,1+], leaves remaining mirrors (*4343).

Symmetry 
The dual tiling has face configuration V6.8.6.8, and represents the fundamental domains of a quadrilateral kaleidoscope, orbifold (*4343), shown here. Adding a 2-fold gyration point at the center of each rhombi defines a (2*43) orbifold. These are subsymmetries of [8,6].

Related polyhedra and tiling

See also

Square tiling
Tilings of regular polygons
List of uniform planar tilings
List of regular polytopes

References
 John H. Conway, Heidi Burgiel, Chaim Goodman-Strass, The Symmetries of Things 2008,  (Chapter 19, The Hyperbolic Archimedean Tessellations)

External links 

 Hyperbolic and Spherical Tiling Gallery
 KaleidoTile 3: Educational software to create spherical, planar and hyperbolic tilings
 Hyperbolic Planar Tessellations, Don Hatch

Hyperbolic tilings
Isogonal tilings
Isotoxal tilings
Uniform tilings